"You Are What You Is" is a single which Frank Zappa released from his 1981 album of the same title. The song is known for going out of its way to use improper English, basically mocking the rest of its context. It was the B-side for 1982 single "Valley Girl". This song was also remixed for the 1984 album Thing-Fish.

Meaning
The lyrics, which essentially tell the listener to be themselves and embrace their culture, tell the stories of two young men, both of whom Zappa describes as "foolish". The first man is from a middle class family who has a great life, but he pretends to come from a culture of hardship and sings the blues to be manly. Then the song refers to him as even trying to eat like someone going through hardship. He begins to talk like the character Kingfish, from the radio show Amos and Andy, who was known for being a heavily stereotypical black character. These themes overall relate to Zappa's dislike of poseurs. The second young man "of the negro persuasion, devoted his life to become a caucasian". Like the first man, he changes his diet to fit in with the culture he is looking to join. It goes over the stereotype of African-Americans eating pork and collard greens. His story is a commentary on African-Americans who are not proud of their heritage and feel following the Caucasian culture would bring them more acceptance. Eventually the song goes into a frenzy of racial stereotyped one-liners including involving a loose story about working at the post office and referencing lyrics in the next song that serves as a segue until it transitions into the next song, "Mudd Club".

Music video
In 1984, Zappa released a music video. Although the film clip used advanced color graphics on normal dance and singing type footage, its circulation was restricted due to parts of it where an actor, who was made to look like Ronald Reagan, was sitting in what looked like an electric chair whilst applying hair pomade. It is also notable for being the only conventional music video that Zappa ever made. The lyrics also contain the sentence "I ain't no nigger no more", which likely also had an effect on its broadcast. The video was banned from ever being aired on MTV. This didn't prevent it from being featured on "Canoe", a 1993 episode of the American television show Beavis and Butt-Head, also aired on MTV (though the show abruptly switches to "The Animal Song" by The Europeans early on, then returns to Zappa for the tail end of "You Are What You Is", to which Butt-Head replies, "This is still on? That pisses me off!").

References to other songs
"You Are What You Is" contains references to other songs throughout his career and on the album itself, commonly referred as Zappa's "Conceptual Continuity". References include "Gimme a five dollar bill and an overcoat too" from "Wonderful Wino" on Zoot Allures, "Lonesome Cowboy Burt" from "200 Motels", with the lyric "Where's my waitress?", and the song "Harder Than Your Husband", which is the 2nd song on the album. Another reference is "Robbie, take me to Greek Town", more prominent in "Jumbo Go Away", and "I'm goin' down 'n' work the wall 'n' work the floor" from "Mudd Club."

Covers
The a cappella group The Persuasions covered "You Are What You Is" on their album Frankly a Cappella.

Track list7"A. "You Are What You Is" – 4:22
B. "Pink Napkins" – 4:3212"'
A1. "You Are What You Is" – 4:22
A2. "Pink Napkins" – 4:32
B1. "Harder Than Your Husband" – 2:29
B2. "Soup 'N Old Clothes" – 7:50

References

1981 songs
Frank Zappa songs
Songs written by Frank Zappa
Song recordings produced by Frank Zappa
Songs against racism and xenophobia
Cultural depictions of Ronald Reagan